This page covers the results of leadership elections in the British Columbia New Democratic Party (known as the Co-operative Commonwealth Federation before 1961).

Early developments

On July 5, 1936, CCF parliamentary leader Robert Connell survived a leadership challenge, 138 votes to 76.  It was also determined, at this meeting, that the party's future leadership would be decided by delegated conventions.

1939 leadership convention
(Held June 26, 1939)

Harold Winch elected 56-11

1953 leadership convention
(Held April 10, 1953)

Arnold Alexander Webster acclaimed

1956 leadership convention
(Held April 6, 1956)

Robert Strachan 72
Leo Thomas Nimsick 35
Arthur James Turner 19

1961 Leadership convention
(Held October 28, 1961)

Robert Strachan acclaimed

1967 leadership challenge

(Held on June 4, 1967, in Burnaby, British Columbia.)

Robert Strachan 278
Thomas R. Berger 177

1969 leadership convention

(Held on April 12, 1969.)

First ballot:

Thomas R. Berger  364
Dave Barrett  249
Bob Williams  130
John Conway  44

Second ballot:

Thomas R. Berger  411
Dave Barrett  375

Berger stepped down as party leader after the NDP lost the provincial election of 1969.  Barrett was subsequently chosen as interim party leader.

1970 leadership convention

(Held June 6, 1970)
Dave Barrett acclaimed

1984 leadership convention

(Held on May 20, 1984.)

First ballot:

David Vickers 269
William Stewart King 240
Robert Skelly 171
Margaret Birrell 141
David Stupich 132
Graham Lea 101

Lea was eliminated, and endorsed Stupich.

Second ballot:

David Vickers 308
William Stewart King 263
Robert Skelly 218
David Stupich 147
Margaret Birrell 134

Birrell was eliminated.  She initially declined to endorse another candidate, but later supported Robert Skelly.

Third ballot:

David Vickers 339
Robert Skelly 313
William Stewart King 292
David Stupich 114

Stupich was eliminated.  He declined to endorse another candidate.

Fourth ballot:

David Vickers 383
Robert Skelly 349
William Stewart King 333

King was eliminated, and endorsed Skelly.

Fifth ballot:

Robert Skelly 606
David Vickers 452

1987 leadership convention

(Held on April 12, 1987.)

Michael Harcourt acclaimed

1996 leadership convention

(Held on February 18, 1996.)

Glen Clark  802
Corky Evans  234
Joan Smallwood  67
Donovan Kuehn  23
Jack McDonald  6

2000 leadership convention

(Held on February 20, 2000.)

Ujjal Dosanjh  769
Corky Evans  549

(Gordon Wilson had been a candidate but withdrew an hour before voting began and endorsed Corky Evans. Labour activist Len Werden had withdrawn the day before the convention.  Joy MacPhail had also been a candidate but she dropped out on January 8, 2000 and threw her support to Ujjal Dosanjh. MacPhail became interim leader after Dosanjh lost his seat in the 2001 provincial election and resigned. On June 4, 2003 she announced her intention to resign as interim leader.)

2003 leadership convention

(Held on November 23, 2003.)

First ballot:

Carole James 325
Nils Jensen 169
Leonard Krog 150
Steve Orcherton 87
Mehdi Najari 32
Peter Dimitrov 12

Second ballot:

Carole James  395
Leonard Krog  219
Nils Jensen  162

2011 leadership convention

(Held on April 17, 2011.)

2014 leadership convention

(Originally to be held September 28, 2014.)

John Horgan acclaimed leader on May 1, 2014, when the nomination deadline passes with no other candidate registering. He officially took over as party leader May 4, 2014.

2022 leadership convention
(Originally to be held on December 3, 2022)

David Eby was acclaimed leader on October 21, 2022, after the only other candidate in the race was disqualified.

References

See also

List of British Columbia general elections
Leader of the Opposition (British Columbia)

 
Political history of British Columbia
New Democratic Party provincial leadership elections